Elmer O. Leatherwood (September 4, 1872 – December 24, 1929) was a U.S. Representative from Utah.

Born on a farm near Waverly, Ohio, Leatherwood attended the public schools.
He moved to Emporia, Kansas, in 1888.
He was graduated from the Kansas State Normal School at Emporia, Kansas, in 1894.
He engaged in public school work 1894–1898.
He studied law.
He was admitted to the bar at Hiawatha, Kansas, in 1898.
He graduated from the law department of the University of Wisconsin–Madison in 1901 and was admitted to practice.
He moved to Salt Lake City, Utah, the same year and continued the practice of his profession.
He served as district attorney for the third judicial district of Utah 1908–1916.
He served as delegate to the Republican National Convention in 1924.
He served as president of the Western Powder Co., Leary & Warren Stockyards, Hellgate Mining & Milling Co., and the Olympus Mining & Milling Co.

Leatherwood was elected as a Republican to the Sixty-seventh and to the four succeeding Congresses and served from March 4, 1921, until his death in Washington, D.C., on December 24, 1929.
He served as chairman of the Committee on Expenditures on Public Buildings (Sixty-eighth and Sixty-ninth Congresses).
He was interred in Mount Olivet Cemetery, Salt Lake City, Utah.

See also
List of United States Congress members who died in office (1900–49)

Sources

External links

1872 births
1929 deaths
University of Wisconsin Law School alumni
District attorneys in Utah
People from Waverly, Ohio
People from Emporia, Kansas
Businesspeople from Salt Lake City
Lawyers from Salt Lake City
Republican Party members of the United States House of Representatives from Utah
19th-century American lawyers